Peter Palmer may refer to:

Peter Palmer (actor) (1931–2021), American actor
Pete Palmer (born 1938), American mathematician and author